Giorgos Nicolaou born May 22, 1982 in Paralimni, Cyprus is a Cypriot football striker who currently plays for Ormideia F.C. He started his career at Enosis Neon Paralimni and he also played for Panachaiki AC Omonia, Olympiakos Nicosia and Nea Salamina.

External links
 

Living people
1982 births
Cypriot footballers
Cyprus international footballers
Association football forwards
Cypriot First Division players
AC Omonia players
Enosis Neon Paralimni FC players
Olympiakos Nicosia players
Nea Salamis Famagusta FC players
Panachaiki F.C. players
Ayia Napa FC players
Ormideia F.C. players